The chief minister of Chhattisgarh is the chief executive of the Indian state of Chhattisgarh. In accordance with the Constitution of India, the governor is a state's de jure head, but de facto executive authority rests with the chief minister. Following elections to the legislative assembly, the state's governor usually invites the party (or coalition) with a majority of seats to form the government. The governor appoints the chief minister, whose council of ministers are collectively responsible to the assembly. Given the confidence of the assembly, the chief minister's term is for five years and is subject to no term limits.

Three people have served as the state's chief minister since Chhattisgarh's formation on 1 November 2000 as a result of the Madhya Pradesh Reorganisation Act, 2000. The first was Ajit Jogi of the Indian National Congress. He was succeeded in 2003 by Raman Singh of the Bharatiya Janata Party who served three consecutive five-year terms. His successor, and current incumbent, is the Indian National Congress leader Bhupesh Baghel who was elected in 2018.

Chief ministers of Chhattisgarh

Timeline

Notes

References

Chhattisgarh
Chief Ministers of Chhattisgarh
Chief Ministers